The Gujarat Police Department is the law enforcement agency for the state of Gujarat in India. The Gujarat Police has its headquarters in Gandhinagar, the state capital, and Ahmedabad.

The Gujarat Police Department came into existence after Gujarat's separation from the Greater Mumbai state on 1 May 1960.


Organisation
The Gujarat Police Department is headed by Director General of Police (DGP.). It has four Commissioners' offices : Ahmedabad, Vadodara, Surat and Rajkot. There are nine ranges in the Gujarat Police: Ahmedabad, Vadodara, Gandhinagar, Surat, Rajkot, Junagadh, Bhavnagar, Dahod Panchmahal  and Border Range. For police administration the state is further divided into 33 police districts and Western Railway Police.

Gujarat Police has some branches for special tasks: Crime, Anti-terrorist squad (ATS) and The Gujarat Intelligence Force wing. The
Gujarat Police was the first state police department to crack the serial bomb blast mystery during 2007–08 in many Indian cities including 2008 Ahmedabad bombings. The Gujarat Intelligence Force wing, is considered to be one of the reputed state police intelligence forces.

Leaders
On 31 January 2023 Vikash Sahay of 1987 batch was elevated to the post of Director General of Police (DGP), replacing Ashish Bhatiya.

List of DGPs of Gujarat 

Following is the list of All DGPs.
{| class="wikitable"
|-
! DGP Name !! From !! to  !! Remarks
|-
| K Chakravarthi || 1 April 2001  || 31 January 2004 || DGP during 2002 Gujarat Riots
|-
| A K Bhargav || 1 February 2004 || 30 April 2006 ||
|- 
|  P C Pandey || April 2006 || February 2009 ||
|-
| Shabbirhusain Khandwawala || February 2009 || December 2010 || First Muslim DGP of Gujarat. Got 1 extension of 3 months.
|-
| Chittranjan Singh || December 2010 || February 2013 || Incharge DGP
|-
| Amitabh Pathak || February 2013 || 24 August 2013 || Died during office tenure
|-
| Pramod Kumar || August 2013 || December 2013|| Incharge DGP 
|-
| P C Thakur || 10 December 2013 || April 2017||
|-
| P P Pandey ||April 2016 || April 2017 || Forced to resign by Supreme Court of India
|-
| Geetha Johri || 4 April 2017|| December 2017|| Incharge DGP
|-
| Pramod Kumar ||December 2017 || February 2018 || Incharge DGP
|-
| Shivanand Jha || 1 March 2018 || 31 July 2020 || Got extension of 3 months
|-
| Ashish Bhatia || 1 August 2020 || 31 January 2023|| Got 2 extension. 2 months and then of 8 months till 31 Jan' 23. 
|-
| Vikas Sahay || 1 February 2023 || 28 February 2023|| incharge
|-

|Vikas Sahay || 1 March 2023 || Incumbent|| |

References

 Shivanand Jha appointed new DGP of Gujarat

 
Government of Gujarat
State law enforcement agencies of India
1960 establishments in Gujarat
Government agencies established in 1960